The Greek-Catholic Church in Badon was a church in Badon, Sălaj, Romania built in the 18th century and demolished on April 5, 2007.

Footnotes

External links 
  International Religious Freedom Report 2007 
 România Liberă, Biserica demolata in Ajunul Floriilor 
 Apocalipsa peste Biserica din Badon! 
 Mediere intre ortodocsi si greco-catolici la Badon 
 Demolarea bisericii din Badon - la mana expertilor 
 Buldozerele lui Ceausescu, in varianta Badon 
 Samanta de scandal intre Biserica Greco-Catolica si Ortodoxa 
 Scandalul bisericii din Badon, citat in raportul SUA despre Romania

Badon
Churches in Sălaj County
18th-century Catholic church buildings